1479 Inkeri, provisional designation , is an asteroid from the central regions of the asteroid belt. It is an exceptionally slow rotator, suspected tumbler and measures approximately 19 kilometers in diameter. It was discovered on 16 February 1938, by Finnish astronomer Yrjö Väisälä at the Iso-Heikkilä Observatory in Turku, Finland. "Inkeri" is the name of two of the discoverer's younger relatives as well as the local name of the former Finnish province of Ingria.

Orbit and classification 

Inkeri is a non-family asteroid from the main belt's background population. It orbits the Sun in the central asteroid belt at a distance of 2.2–3.2 AU once every 4 years and 5 months (1,601 days). Its orbit has an eccentricity of 0.19 and an inclination of 7° with respect to the ecliptic.

Physical characteristics 

In the Tholen classification, Inkeris spectral type is ambiguous (XFU). It is closest to that of an X-type asteroid and somewhat similar to the F-types. In addition, the spectrum has also been flagged as "unusual" (U).

Slow rotator and tumbler 

In December 2011, a rotational lightcurve of Inkeri was obtained from photometric observations by Andrea Ferrero at the Bigmuskie Observatory , Italy, in collaboration with Frederick Pilcher at the Organ Mesa Observatory  in New Mexico, United States. Analysis of the bimodal lightcurve gave an exceptionally long rotation period of 660 hours with a brightness amplitude of 1.30 magnitude.

This makes it one of the slowest rotators known to exist. The observers also suspect that the body is a tumbling asteroid in a non-principal axis rotation. These results supersede previous period solutions of 5 and 12.55 hours.

Diameter and albedo 

According to the surveys carried out by the Japanese Akari satellite and the NEOWISE mission of NASA's Wide-field Infrared Survey Explorer, Inkeri measures between 15.206 and 31.86 kilometers in diameter and its surface has an albedo between 0.033 and 0.2222.

The Collaborative Asteroid Lightcurve Link assumes an albedo of 0.10 and calculates a diameter of 18.35 kilometers based on an absolute magnitude of 11.8.

Naming 

This minor planet was named "Inkeri", a Finnish female name, held by Vaisala's granddaughter and niece. It is also the Finnish name of Ingria, a formerly-Finnish province near Saint Petersburg that is now part of Russia. The official  was published by the Minor Planet Center in January 1956.

References

External links 
 Asteroid Lightcurve Database (LCDB), query form (info )
 Dictionary of Minor Planet Names, Google books
 Asteroids and comets rotation curves, CdR – Observatoire de Genève, Raoul Behrend
 Discovery Circumstances: Numbered Minor Planets (1)-(5000) – Minor Planet Center
 
 

001479
Discoveries by Yrjö Väisälä
Named minor planets
001479
001479
19380216